Homotaurine (also known as tramiprosate (INN), 3-amino-1-propanesulfonic acid, or 3-APS) is a natural sulfonic acid found in seaweed. It is analogous to taurine, but with an extra carbon in its chain. It has GABAergic activity, apparently by mimicking GABA, which it resembles.

Homotaurine was investigated in a Phase III clinical trial as a potential treatment for Alzheimer's disease (AD) that did not show efficacy. However, post-hoc analyses have shown positive and significant effects of homotaurine on secondary endpoints and subgroups of patients, including a reduction in hippocampal volume loss and lower decline in memory function in the overall cohort, as well as a reduction in global cognitive decline in APOE4 allele carriers, suggesting a disease-modifying effect.  A study in cognitive impairment done in 2018 did show positive benefits.

Homotaurine is currently in a phase 3 study with expected FDA approval as the first disease modifying drug for AD.

Medical use
Acamprosate (N-acetyl homotaurine) was approved by the FDA in 2004 to treat alcohol dependence.

Biochemical properties
In preclinical studies it had been found to bind to soluble amyloid beta and inhibit the formation of neurotoxic aggregates. Homotaurine has also shown anticonvulsant activities, reduction in skeletal muscle tonus, and hypothermic activity.

Homotaurine has been reported as a GABA antagonist, as well as a GABA agonist.  In vitro studies have found that homotaurine is a GABAA partial agonist as well as a GABAB receptor partial agonist with low efficacy, becoming an antagonist and displacing the full agonists GABA and baclofen at this receptor. In a study in rats, homotaurine reversed the catatonia induced by baclofen (the prototypical GABAB agonist), and was able to produce analgesia via the GABAB receptor, an effect that was abolished when CGP-35348, a GABAB receptor antagonist was applied.

In a human study homotaurine selectively and fully inhibits the formation of Aβ42 oligomers at the clinical dose, without evidence of vasogenic edema.

One study in rats showed that homotaurine suppressed ethanol-stimulated dopamine release, as well as ethanol intake and preference in rats in a way similar to the N-acetyl derivative of homotaurine, acamprosate.

References 

Anticonvulsants
Sulfonic acids
Amines
Neuroprotective agents
GABAA receptor agonists
GABAB receptor antagonists